The 1986 Senior League World Series took place from August 11–16 in Kissimmee, Florida, United States. Taipei, Taiwan defeated Brenham, Texas in the championship game. This was the first SLWS held in Kissimmee.

Teams

Results

References

Senior League World Series
Senior League World Series
1986 in sports in Florida
Sports competitions in Florida
Sports in Kissimmee, Florida
Events in Kissimmee, Florida